Bermuda competed at the 1964 Summer Olympics in Tokyo, Japan.

Sailing

Open

References
Official Olympic Reports

Nations at the 1964 Summer Olympics
1964
1964 in Bermudian sport